Cossula omaia is a moth in the family Cossidae. It is found in Guyana.

The wingspan is about 70 mm. The forewings are dark purple brown, shaded with reddish brown on the inner margin and with faint darker striae. The hindwings are fuscous brown.

References

Natural History Museum Lepidoptera generic names catalog

Cossulinae
Moths described in 1921